Eden Wood (born February 18, 2005) is an American actress and reality television star. She is known for her role as Darla in The Little Rascals Save the Day, and her many appearances on the reality television show Toddlers & Tiaras.

Filmography

Personal life 
Wood is an only child. Her mother, Mickie Wood, had her at age 40 and appeared on screen with her in Toddlers & Tiaras.

References

External links 

 

American child actresses
2005 births
Participants in American reality television series
Living people
Child beauty pageant contestants
Actresses from Arkansas
21st-century American women